The Arizona Kid is a 1930 American pre-Code Western film directed by Alfred Santell. It was produced by Fox Film Corporation.

The first of three sequels to the Academy Award-winning film In Old Arizona (1928), it stars Warner Baxter in the title role (a character based on the Cisco Kid by O. Henry). The film features Carole Lombard in one of her early roles.

The film was a hit at the box office.

Parts of the film were shot in Grafton, Rockville Road, and Zion National Park in Utah.

Cast
 Warner Baxter as The Arizona Kid
 Carole Lombard as Virginia Hoyt
 Theodore von Eltz as Dick Hoyt
 Hank Mann as Bartender Bill
 Mona Maris as Lorita
 Wilfred Lucas as Manager
 James Gibson as Stage Guard
 Larry McGrath as Homer Snook
 Jack Herrick as The Hoboken Hooker
 Walter P. Lewis as Sheriff Jim Andrews
 Arthur Stone as Snakebite Pete 
 De Sacia Mooers as Molly
 Soledad Jiminez as Pulga
 Horace B. Carpenter as Jake Grant
 Art Mix as Mack (uncredited)
 Charles Stevens as Mexican (uncredited)

References

External links
 

1930 films
1930 Western (genre) films
American Western (genre) films
American black-and-white films
American sequel films
Adaptations of works by O. Henry
Films directed by Alfred Santell
Cisco Kid
Films shot in Utah
Fox Film films
1930s American films
1930s English-language films